Jean Janssens (born 28 September 1944) is a former Belgian football player who won the Belgian Golden Shoe in 1979 while at Beveren. He was capped 7 times and scored 1 goal for the Belgium national team.

Honours 
Individual

 Belgian Golden Shoe: 1979
 Man of the Season (Belgian First Division): 1978–79

References

Belgian footballers
K.S.K. Beveren players
1944 births
Living people
Belgium international footballers
Association football forwards